The Tampa Bay Rays are a Major League Baseball (MLB) franchise based in St. Petersburg, Florida. They play in the American League East division. The first game of the new baseball season for a team is played on Opening Day, and being named the Opening Day starter is an honor, which is often given to the player who is expected to lead the pitching staff that season, though there are various strategic reasons why a team's best pitcher might not start on Opening Day. The Rays have used fifteen different Opening Day starting pitchers in their twenty-five seasons. "No decisions" are awarded to the starting pitcher if the game is won or lost after the starting pitcher has left the game.

Chris Archer and James Shields holds the Rays' record for most Opening Day starts with four. Archer has one win, two losses, and one no decision, while Shields has one win, one loss, and two no decisions. The all-time record for a Tampa Bay starting pitcher winning an Opening Day game is one, shared by Steve Trachsel, Albie Lopez, Victor Zambrano, James Shields, David Price, and Chris Archer.

Overall, Rays starting pitchers have a combined 4–7 record at home and 2–3 when they are away for Opening Day. In , the Rays opened the season against the New York Yankees at Tokyo Dome in Tokyo, Japan. Although that game was not played in Tampa Bay's actual home of Tropicana Field, it was still considered a home game for the Rays. Tampa Bay beat the Yankees 8–3 in that game, giving starting pitcher Victor Zambrano the win.

Key

Pitchers

References 

Lists of Major League Baseball Opening Day starting pitchers
Opening day starters